Topological Gardens was a 2009 art exhibition by Bruce Nauman at the 53rd Venice Biennale. The artist, representing the United States at the Biennale, received the festival's Golden Lion prize for best national participation.

Further reading

External links 

 Catalog

American contemporary art
2009 in art
2009 in Italy
Sculpture exhibitions
Solo art exhibitions
Venice Biennale exhibitions